Davorin Jenko (born Martin Jenko; 9 November 1835 – 25 November 1914) was a Slovene composer. He is sometimes considered the father of Slovenian national Romantic music. Among other songs, he composed the melody for the Serbian national anthem "Bože pravde" ("God of Justice"), the former Slovenian national anthem "Naprej, zastava Slave" ("Forward, Flag of Glory!"), and the popular Serbian and Montenegrin song "Serbian Marseillaise".

Biography
Jenko was born in the Upper Carniolan village of Dvorje, in what was then the Austrian Empire, and baptized Martinus Jenko. After graduating from high school in Trieste, he went to Vienna, where he studied law. During his Viennese stay, he founded the Slovene Choir Society in Vienna, which was sponsored by the national liberal politician Valentin Zarnik.

In 1862, he moved to the town of Pančevo in southern Vojvodina, Serbia, where he worked as the choirmaster of the local Serbian Orthodox Church. He later moved on the other side of the Austrian-Serbian border to Belgrade, where he worked as a composer in the Serbian National Theatre. Jenko was named among the first four members of the Academy of Arts of the Royal Serbian Academy of Sciences, named by King Milan I of Serbia on 5 April 1887.

He lived in Serbia until 1897, when he moved to Ljubljana in his native Carniola. He died in Ljubljana, and was buried in the Žale cemetery in the Bežigrad district. In Belgrade, an international music competition is dedicated to Davorin Jenko.

Works
During his life, Jenko composed several pieces both in Slovene and Serbian. He wrote the first Serbian operetta (The Sorceress, Врачара 1882) and composed the music for the Serbian national anthem, based on the lyrics of Jovan Đorđević.

Most of his Slovene pieces were composed during his stay in Vienna. In 1860, he composed the music for the patriotic song Naprej, zastava Slave for the lyrics written by his cousin Simon Jenko. He also composed several other Slovene patriotic poems, which later became a crucial part of the Slovenian national canon.

See also
 Kosta Manojlović
 Petar Krstić
 Miloje Milojević
 Stevan Hristić
 Stevan Mokranjac
 Isidor Bajić
 Jovan Đorđević
 Josif Marinković
 Nenad Barački
 Tihomir Ostojić
 Stefan Stratimirović
 Branko Cvejić
 Stefan Lastavica
 Stanislav Binicki

References

External links

1835 births
1914 deaths
19th-century composers
19th-century male musicians
20th-century composers
20th-century male musicians
Burials at Žale
Male composers
National anthem writers
Members of the Serbian Academy of Sciences and Arts
People from the Kingdom of Serbia
People from the Municipality of Cerklje na Gorenjskem
Serbian people of Slovenian descent
Slovenian composers
University of Vienna alumni